Cross Roads is a borough in York County, Pennsylvania, United States. The population was 524 at the 2020 census. The cross roads in the borough is where Church Road (SR 2050) intersects Cross Roads Avenue (SR 2079) and are joined by Century Farms Road. East of the intersection Century Farms Road is numbered SR 2050 and Church Road is unnumbered.

Geography
Cross Roads is located at  (39.814737, -76.573146).

Demographics

As of the census of 2000, there were 518 people, 175 households, and 149 families living in the borough. The population density was 275.5 people per square mile (106.4/km2). There were 185 housing units at an average density of 98.4 per square mile (38.0/km2). The racial makeup of the borough was 96.14% White, 2.90% African American, 0.19% Asian, and 0.77% from two or more races. Hispanic or Latino of any race were 0.39% of the population.

There were 175 households, out of which 44.0% had children under the age of 18 living with them, 77.7% were married couples living together, 5.1% had a female householder with no husband present, and 14.3% were non-families. 10.3% of all households were made up of individuals, and 4.0% had someone living alone who was 65 years of age or older. The average household size was 2.96 and the average family size was 3.19.

In the borough the population was spread out, with 31.1% under the age of 18, 6.4% from 18 to 24, 33.6% from 25 to 44, 23.0% from 45 to 64, and 6.0% who were 65 years of age or older. The median age was 34 years. For every 100 females there were 97.0 males. For every 100 females age 18 and over, there were 96.2 males.

The median income for a household in the borough was $57,750, and the median income for a family was $60,556. Males had a median income of $40,000 versus $31,875 for females. The per capita income for the borough was $20,063. About 2.5% of families and 3.0% of the population were below the poverty line, including 3.4% of those under age 18 and none of those age 65 or over.

Education
Cross Roads Borough is served by the South Eastern School District which provides public education.

References

Populated places established in 1844
Boroughs in York County, Pennsylvania
1899 establishments in Pennsylvania